Daniel Richard McCarrell Sr. is a retired men's basketball coach who won three national championships at North Park College in Chicago, Illinois.

McCarrell led North Park College to three consecutive National Collegiate Athletic Association (NCAA) Division III Men's National Championships in 1978, 1979 and 1980. Thereafter, he coached at Minnesota State University, Mankato, from 1984 to 2001.

Notable Players 

 Modzel Greer
 Mike Harper
 Michael Thomas

Honors 
McCarrell was named the National Association of Basketball Coaches (NABC) Coach of the Year in 1978, 1979 and 1980. He was inducted into the Illinois Basketball Coaches Association (IBCA) Hall of Fame in 1985; the North Park University Hall of Fame in 1988; and the Minnesota State University, Mankato, Hall of Fame in 2009. He also received the IBCA Tom "Buzzy" O'Connor Award in 1980.

References

1938 births
Living people
Basketball coaches from Illinois
People from Cicero, Illinois